Rumbo is a 1949 Spanish drama film set in Seville and directed by Ramón Torrado. It was entered into the 1951 Cannes Film Festival.

Cast
 Fernando Granada - Rumbo
 Paquita Rico - Dulcenombre
 Fernando Fernández de Córdoba - Gabriel Hurtado Mendoza (as Fernando Fdez. de Cordoba)
 Julia Lajos
 Manuel Arbó - (as Manuel Arbo)
 Eloísa Muro - (as Eloisa Muro)
 Miguel Gómez - (as Miguel Gomez)
 Rosita Valero
 Tino G. Ferry
 José Riesgo
 Guillermo Cereceda
 Mancusa - Antonio, el gitanillo (as Vilches y Mancusa)
 Vilches - Rosarillo, la gitanilla (as Vilches y Mancusa)

References

External links

1949 films
1949 drama films
1940s Spanish-language films
Films directed by Ramón Torrado
Spanish drama films
1940s Spanish films